Blagovac is a settlement in Vogošća municipality, near Sarajevo, Federation of Bosnia and Herzegovina, Bosnia and Herzegovina.

It is divided into five sub parts which are: Blagovac 1 (factory area), Blagovac 2 (international dog training center in Miro Dukić's house), Blagovac 3 (local mosque that was built after the Bosnian War, shopping center) and Blagovac 4 and 5.

History
First settlers in Blagovac were the Blagovčanin family. Before the Bosnian conflicts Blagovac was entirely populated by a Serbian population. After the war, and with the forming of Republika Srpska, most of the Serbs sold their houses and moved to Pale or other places with a Serbian majority. Now Blagovac is mainly populated by Muslims however there are still few houses with Serbian families left.

Population

Ethnic composition, 1991 census
 Serbs – 1,159 (90.97%)
 Yugoslavs – 50 (3.92%)
 Croats – 27 (2.11%)
 Muslims – 16 (1.25%)
 Others and unknown – 22 (1.72%)
Total – 1,274

2013 census 
 Serbs – 64 (3.3%)
 Croats – 15 (0.8%)
 Bosniaks – 1,842 (94.2%)
 Others and unknown – 35 (1.8%)
Total – 1,956

References

Populated places in Vogošća